Parkasaurus is a dinosaur zoo construction and management simulation video game developed by Washbear Studio. It entered Steam Early Access on September 25, 2018, and officially released on August 13, 2020. The player is tasked to create a dinosaur zoo by building and designing dinosaur exhibits. The game was also released on the Nintendo Switch on April 28, 2022.

Gameplay 
The standard game mode revolves around hiring employees, hatching dinosaur eggs, and catching dinosaurs if they escape. The player can use various components such as fences and plants to create exhibits for dinosaurs. All zoo buildings can be chosen from a build menu and placed within the zoo to generate income with its perks. Guests who stay longer at the location will also pay more. Among the employees, scientists can search around to find fossils, create new dinosaur eggs, and janitors clean up by taking the trash out. Single player mode is supported. Each dinosaur has certain diet and habitat needs, as well as privacy requirements. There are some basic biomes can be created immediately, but for others, some terrain needs be tweaked (water supplies, making it more rugged, adding trees). The game has two skill trees, that will unlock new buildings, dinosaurs, and items.

Reception 

Parkasaurus received "mixed or average" reviews for Windows according to review aggregator Metacritic; the Nintendo Switch version received "generally favorable" reviews.

Awards 
Parkasaurus has won some awards during the development including Ubisoft Indie Series National Bank Special Prize Winner 2019, Pax Online 2020 Indie Showcase Selection and The MIX Pax West Showcase Selection 2019.

References

External links 
 Official website

2020 video games
Simulation video games
Single-player video games
Windows games
Nintendo Switch games
Early access video games
Video games developed in Canada